The 37th British Academy Film Awards, given by the British Academy of Film and Television Arts in 1984, honoured the best films of 1983.

Winners and nominees

Statistics

See also
 56th Academy Awards
 9th César Awards
 36th Directors Guild of America Awards
 41st Golden Globe Awards
 4th Golden Raspberry Awards
 10th Saturn Awards
 36th Writers Guild of America Awards

1983 film awards
1984 in British cinema
Film037
1983 awards in the United Kingdom